Plantation Mobile Home Park is a census-designated place (CDP) in Palm Beach County, Florida, United States. The population was 1,462 at the 2020 census.

Geography
Plantation Mobile Home Park is located at  (26.702392, -80.132515).

According to the United States Census Bureau, the CDP has a total area of 0.7 km (0.3 mi2), of which 0.7 km (0.3 mi2) is land and 3.85% is water.

Demographics

As of the census of 2000, there were 1,218 people, 490 households, and 293 families residing in the CDP.  The population density was 1,808.7/km (4,734.5/mi2).  There were 531 housing units at an average density of 788.5/km (2,064.0/mi2).  The racial makeup of the CDP was 73.65% White (66.3% were Non-Hispanic White,) 13.14% African American, 0.25% Native American, 0.41% Asian, 0.16% Pacific Islander, 6.65% from other races, and 5.75% from two or more races. Hispanic or Latino of any race were 17.41% of the population.

There were 490 households, out of which 32.0% had children under the age of 18 living with them, 33.3% were married couples living together, 20.0% had a female householder with no husband present, and 40.2% were non-families. 29.8% of all households were made up of individuals, and 8.6% had someone living alone who was 65 years of age or older.  The average household size was 2.49 and the average family size was 3.07.

In the CDP, the population was spread out, with 27.8% under the age of 18, 8.9% from 18 to 24, 33.8% from 25 to 44, 19.4% from 45 to 64, and 10.2% who were 65 years of age or older.  The median age was 34 years. For every 100 females, there were 100.3 males.  For every 100 females age 18 and over, there were 97.3 males.

The median income for a household in the CDP was $32,734, and the median income for a family was $32,963. Males had a median income of $30,856 versus $20,724 for females. The per capita income for the CDP was $13,325.  About 17.5% of families and 20.8% of the population were below the poverty line, including 36.7% of those under age 18 and 11.2% of those age 65 or over.

As of 2000, English was the first language for 86.88% of all residents, while Spanish was the mother tongue for 13.11% of the population.

References

Census-designated places in Palm Beach County, Florida
Census-designated places in Florida